A pen gun is a firearm that resembles an ink pen.  They generally are of small caliber (e.g., .22 LR, .25 ACP, .32 ACP, .38-caliber, etc.) and are single shot.  Early examples of pen guns were pinfired, but modern designs are rim or centerfire.  Some pen guns are not designed to fire regular cartridges, but rather blank cartridges, signal flares, or tear gas cartridges.

In the United States, pen guns that can fire bullet or shot cartridges and do not require a reconfiguration to fire (e.g., folding to the shape of a pistol) are federally regulated as an Any Other Weapon (Title II).  They require registration under the National Firearms Act and a tax in the amount of five dollars is levied.

According to the FBI, pen guns were widely used for self-defense in the 20th century.

References

External links
 Braverman "Stinger" Pen Gun
 OSS "Stinger" Covert Cigarette Guns

.22 LR firearms